William Bree ( 19 November 1822 – 28 January 1917) was Archdeacon of Coventry from 1887 until 1908.

The son of The Rev William Thomas Bree, MA, Rector of Allesley he was educated at Bridgnorth Endowed School and Merton College, Oxford. He was ordained in 1848, and was curate at Polebrook until 1863, when he succeeded his father at Allesley.    He married firstly, in 1853, Mary Duke; and, secondly, Sophy Adèle Biggs. His great nephew, the actor James Bree, was patron of the benefice until his death in 2008.

References

1822 births
1917 deaths
People from Warwickshire
People educated at Bridgnorth Endowed School
19th-century English Anglican priests
20th-century English Anglican priests
Alumni of Merton College, Oxford
Archdeacons of Coventry